Steve Morrison (born 3 March 1947) is a Scottish television producer and a former Rector of the University of Edinburgh.

Early life
Morrison was born in Glasgow and studied Politics at the University of Edinburgh. In 1968, he became the first student to stand for the post of Rector. Following his studies at Edinburgh, Morrison attended the National Film and Television School.

Morrison played a founding role in the Third World First campaign group, which became the anti-poverty campaign group People & Planet.

Career
Morrison become a radio producer with BBC Scotland. Morrison joined Granada Television in 1974. Here, he formed Granada Film before becoming Director of Programmes and, in 2001, Chief Executive. In 2003, Morrison co-founded independent TV production and distribution company all3media, becoming non-executive chairman in 2013. Morrison's production credits include My Left Foot, The Field and Jack and Sarah.

In 2015, Morrison was elected Rector of the University of Edinburgh, beating incumbent Peter McColl with 61.9% of votes.

Morrison sits on the advisory board of the Edinburgh College of Art.

References

Living people
BBC Board members
Alumni of the University of Edinburgh
Alumni of the National Film and Television School
1947 births
Rectors of the University of Edinburgh